Durgin-Park was a centuries-old restaurant at 340 Faneuil Hall Marketplace in downtown Boston. The Greater Boston Convention and Visitors Bureau stated that it had been a "landmark since 1827", and it was a popular tourist destination within Quincy Market.  The restaurant had entrances on both of its facades (Faneuil Hall and Clinton Street).

On January 3, 2019, the owners announced that their last day of service would be January 12, 2019; the restaurant closed permanently on that date. A satellite location at Boston's Logan International Airport remains open as of that date.

History
The first restaurant at this former warehouse was opened in 1742 and was purchased in 1827 by John Durgin and Eldridge Park, becoming a Boston landmark. By 1840, Durgin & Park took on John G. Chandler as a third partner.  It was this trio that established the concepts of food and service that have remained essentially unchanged. During the Reconstruction era—after the deaths of Durgin and Park—Chandler continued to run the operation and his family owned it until 1945, when it was sold to James Hallett, who ran the operation until 1977, enhancing the restaurant's national reputation.

The restaurant was purchased by the Kelley family in 1972, and sold by them to Ark Restaurants in January 2007, although Seana Kelley remained the general manager until 2012. The general manager later became Patricia Reyes, who had worked for Ark Restaurants since 1999.

For a time, Durgin-Park had an additional location at Copley Place in Boston. The original Durgin-Park, as well as the one in Copley Place, was included in an "old Boston" dining review by Alexander Theroux of The New York Times in 1985.

In the late summer of 2010, Durgin-Park opened a beer garden in their basement bar, called "The Hideout". In late 2016, the basement bar began hosting a weekly stand-up comedy showcase under the name Hideout Comedy. Shows ran Wednesdays, Fridays, Saturdays, and Sundays featuring local and nationally touring comedians.

Durgin Park had only one female chef in its long history, Melicia Phillips, who worked there in 2012 and 2013.

In December 2017, an episode of the Travel Channel's Man v. Food—season 6 episode 2—hosted by Casey Webb, included a segment at Durgin-Park.

In early January 2019, the CEO of Ark Restaurants announced that Durgin-Park would close on January 12, due to the restaurant not being profitable. The restaurant did permanently close on that date. In February 2019, an internet auction was initiated to sell over 200 items from the restaurant.

Logan Airport location
In January 2013, it was announced that Ark Restaurants had licensed a sub-location at Logan International Airport at which Durgin-Park would be offering soups and sandwiches; located in Terminal E, it opened in March 2013. The airport restaurant survived the closure of the Faneuil Hall location, but was no longer listed on the Massport website as of 2022.

Ambiance
In keeping with its long history, the concept of Durgin-Park maintained the tradition of communal seating at long tables. The menu was designed to offer traditional New England-style fare with a concentration on seafoods, chowders, broiled meats and boiled dinners. The service was also a partial hold-over from the time of its founding, as the waitstaff were encouraged to adopt a "surly" attitude and "backtalk" the clientele.  Another sign of its heritage was that it only changed head chefs a handful of times in its history.

Honors and awards
1998: James Beard Foundation Award for America's Regional Classics

Photos

See also
 Union Oyster House

References

Further reading

External links
 Durgin-Park - Boston, MA at Roadfood.com

Defunct restaurants in Boston
Restaurants established in 1827
Restaurants established in 1742
Restaurants disestablished in 2019
1742 establishments in Massachusetts
2019 disestablishments in Massachusetts
James Beard Foundation Award winners